Jordan Airport  is a county-owned, public-use airport located two nautical miles (4 km) northwest of the central business district of Jordan, a town in Garfield County, Montana, United States. It is included in the National Plan of Integrated Airport Systems for 2011–2015, which categorized it as a general aviation airport.

Facilities and aircraft 

Jordan Airport covers an area of 234 acres (95 ha) at an elevation of 2,662 feet (811 m) above mean sea level. It has one runway designated 11/29 with an asphalt surface measuring 4,300 by 75 feet (1,311 x 23 m).

For the 12-month period ending August 6, 2008, the airport had 2,050 general aviation aircraft operations, an average of 170 per month.

References

External links 

Airports in Montana
Buildings and structures in Garfield County, Montana
Transportation in Garfield County, Montana